Ferae ("wild beasts") is a mirorder of placental mammals that groups together clades Pan-Carnivora and Pholidotamorpha. The Ferae is a sister group to the clade Pan-Euungulata and together they make grandorder Ferungulata.

Classification and phylogeny

Taxonomy 
{|
! Traditional classification: !! Revised classification:
|- style="vertical-align:top;"
|
 Clade: Ferae 
 Order: Carnivora  (carnivorans)
 Order: Cimolesta  [including pangolins]
 Order: †Creodonta  (false carnivorans)
|
 Mirorder: Ferae 
 Clade: Pan-Carnivora 
 Clade: Carnivoramorpha  (carnivorans and stem-relatives)
 Order: †Hyaenodonta 
 Order: †Oxyaenodonta 
 Family: †Oxyaenidae 
 Family: †Wyolestidae 
 Genus: †Simidectes 
 (unranked): †Altacreodus/Tinerhodon clade
 Genus: †Altacreodus 
 Genus: †Tinerhodon 
 Clade: Pholidotamorpha 
 Order: Pholidota  (pangolins)
 Order: †Palaeanodonta  (stem-pangolins)
|}

Phylogeny
The phylogenetic relationships of mirorder Ferae are shown in the following cladogram, reconstructed from mitochondrial and nuclear DNA and protein characters, as well as the fossil record.

Position of pangolins
Pangolins were long thought to be the closest relatives of Xenarthra (armadillos, anteaters, and sloths), forming to the polyphyletic group Edentata. Research based on immunodiffusion technique and comparison of protein and DNA sequences revealed the close relationships between pangolins and carnivorans. Living pangolins and carnivorans also share a few unusual derived morphological and anatomical traits, such as the ossified tentorium cerebelli and the fusion of the scaphoid and lunate bones in the wrist. The last common ancestor of extant Ferae is supposed to have diversified c. 78.9 million years ago.

Sister groups to Ferae
According to recent studies (reflected in the diagram below), the closest living relatives of Ferae are members of mirorder Euungulata (group of mammals which includes order Perissodactyla and Artiodactyla).

An alternate phylogeny holds that the closest relatives to the Ferae are the Perissodactyla and Chiroptera (bats), not Artiodactyla. Ferae together with Perissodactyla has been called Zooamata. Ferae, Perissodactyla, and Chiroptera together has been called Pegasoferae. Subsequent molecular studies have generally failed to support the proposal.

Fossil members

Position of creodonts
While there has been strong support in the inclusion of order Creodonta into Ferae, they were usually recovered as sister taxon to Carnivora. Diagnostic traits shared by creodonts and carnivorans include the presence of carnassial teeth. The Halliday et al. (2015) phylogenetic analysis of hundreds of morphological characters of Paleocene placentals found instead that creodonts might be the sister group to Pholidotamorpha (pangolins and their stem-relatives). However, recent studies have show Creodonta is invalid polyphyletic taxon. Members of this group are part of clade Pan-Carnivora and sister taxa to Carnivoramorpha (carnivorans and their stem-relatives). They are split in two groups: order Oxyaenodonta on one side and order Hyaenodonta plus its stem-relatives (Altacreodus and Tinerhodon) on the other.

Alternative classification and possible members
In Halliday et al. (2015) various enigmatic Palaeocene mammals have been proposed to be possible members to Ferae, like members of suboders Pantodonta and Taeniodonta, and families Didelphodontidae, Nyctitheriidae, Oxyclaenidae, Palaeoryctidae, Pantolestidae, Pentacodontidae, Periptychidae and Triisodontidae. In addition various "hoofed mammals" like the mesonychians and arctocyonids (usually considered as a stem-artiodactyls) also placed in this group. Mesonychians are placed as the sister group to carnivoramorphs, while arctocyonids are polyphyletic with Arctocyon and Loxolophus sister to pantodonts and periptychids, Goniacodon and Eoconodon sister to the Carnivoramorpha-Mesonychia clade, most other genera allied with creodonts and palaeoryctidans. This enlarged Ferae was also found to be the sister group to Chiroptera, even though recent studies despute this classification.

See also
 Mammal classification
 Ferungulata

References

 
Mammal unranked clades